Rovira is a corregimiento in Dolega District, Chiriquí Province, Panama. Its population as of 1990 was 1,380; its population as of 2000 was 1,703.

References

Corregimientos of Chiriquí Province